Abdul-Karim Zito is a Ghanaian football coach and a former professional footballer who currently coaches the Ghana national under-20 football team. He previously coached Ghana Premier League club Medeama S.C and Dreams F.C.

Coaching career 
In 2020 he was named the coach for the Ghana national under-20 football team by the Ghana Football Association.

References 

Living people
Ghanaian football managers
Asante Kotoko S.C. players
Ghanaian footballers
Year of birth missing (living people)
Dreams F.C. (Ghana) managers
Medeama S.C. managers
Association footballers not categorized by position